Sisowath Monireth (25 November 1909 – September 1975) was a Cambodian politician who served as the Prime Minister of Cambodia, during the French protectorate period, from 17 October 1945 to 15 December 1946. One of the most prominent members of the Sisowath line of the royal family at the time, he had earlier been passed over for the throne by the French authorities in favor of his nephew Norodom Sihanouk, whom they considered to be more pliable. The prince, however, remained heir to the throne under Sihanouk's reign.

From 1939 to 1945, he fought for France in World War II.

Early life
The original Cambodian Scout movement Ankar Khamarak Kayarith was created in 1934, under the direction of Prince Sisowath Monireth and other leaders, including Tem Im and Pok Thiem. This first era of Cambodian Scouting spread over several provinces and numbered more than 1,000 members.

Period in office
One of his first acts as Prime Minister was to create the first modern Cambodian army. Having won the consent of the French, who had just returned to power in Cambodia after the defeat of the Japanese in World War II, Monireth succeeded in forming out of former colonial NCOs the basis for an indigenous army whose mission, according to the Franco-Khmer Military Convention of 20 November 1946, was to uphold the sovereignty of the king, to preserve internal security, and to defend the frontiers of the country.

In later years, Monireth temporarily acted as head of state from 6 April to 13 June 1960 in his capacity as Chairman of the Regency Council. 

In 1975, he was executed by the Khmer Rouge after the Fall of Pnom Penh.

See also

References

 

1909 births
1975 deaths
20th-century Cambodian politicians
Cambodian princes
Scouting pioneers
Sangkum politicians
Scouting and Guiding in Cambodia
Executed Cambodian people
People executed by the Khmer Rouge
People who died in the Cambodian genocide
Prime Ministers of Cambodia
French military personnel of World War II
House of Sisowath
Soldiers of the French Foreign Legion
Sons of kings